The canton of Digne-les-Bains-Ouest is a former administrative division in southeastern France. It was disbanded following the French canton reorganisation which came into effect in March 2015. It had 12,820 inhabitants (2012).

The canton comprised the following communes:

Aiglun
Barras
Le Castellard-Melan
Le Chaffaut-Saint-Jurson
Champtercier
Digne-les-Bains (partly)
Hautes-Duyes
Mallemoisson
Mirabeau
Thoard

Demographics

See also
Cantons of the Alpes-de-Haute-Provence department

References

Former cantons of Alpes-de-Haute-Provence
2015 disestablishments in France
States and territories disestablished in 2015